Howard Banford Siler Jr. (June 18, 1945 – July 8, 2014) was an American bobsledder who competed from the late 1960s to the early 1980s.

Biography
Siler won a bronze medal in the four-man event at the 1969 FIBT World Championships in Lake Placid, New York. Competing in two Winter Olympics, Siler earned his best finish of fifth in the two-man event at the 1980 Winter Olympics in Lake Placid. Siler was a 5-time US champion and a 9 time member of the US World team.

In 1985, Siler served as the United States team coach and also Chairman of the US Bobsled Federation Competition Committee.

Siler later coached the Jamaican bobsleigh team that participated at the 1988 Winter Olympics in Calgary. He would be profiled as Irving "Irv" Blitzer (played by John Candy) in the American film Cool Runnings (1993).

References

External links
Bobsleigh four-man world championship medalists since 1930
1980 Winter Olympics two-man results
Interview with Jamaican bobsledder Devon "Pete" Harris featuring Siler.

American male bobsledders
Bobsledders at the 1972 Winter Olympics
Bobsledders at the 1980 Winter Olympics
Olympic bobsledders of the United States
1945 births
2014 deaths